State Highway 8, also abbreviated as SH-8 or OK-8, is a highway maintained by the U.S. state of Oklahoma. Because it runs mainly north–south, it has an even number (which is normal for Oklahoma state highways, but opposite from national highways). Highway 8 runs from U.S. Highway 277 in Cyril, Oklahoma to the state line south of Kiowa, Kansas, for a total length of  The highway has two lettered spur routes.

Highway 8 dates from the creation of the state highway system in 1924. Initially a border-to-border route, it was shortened to its current extent due to encroaching U.S. highways. SH-8 has followed its current route since 1966.

Route description

The highway begins in Cyril, at US-277 (which at the time is concurrent with State Highway 19), and immediately heads northward.  later, the highway passes through Anadarko, sharing a brief overlap with US-62/SH-9. It also becomes concurrent with US-281 here, which it remains with after passing through Anadarko.

SH-152 splits off to the west at Binger, and US-281/SH-8 go northward through Lookeba to meet SH-37 at its western terminus in Hinton.  to the north, the two highways have an interchange with Interstate 40 at its milemarker 101. After this, US-281/SH-8 cross the Canadian River and begin a concurrency with U.S. Highway 270 in Geary. SH-8 splits off by itself after passing through Watonga,  to the north.

North of Watonga, SH-8 generally runs parallel to SH-51A and, after intersecting SH-51 in Okeene, it runs parallel to SH-58.  north of Okeene, SH-58 and SH-8 switch places through a  overlap, with SH-8 ending up running to the west through Fairview and SH-58 running to the east to Ringwood.

Through Cherokee, the Alfalfa County seat, it overlaps U.S. Highway 64 and SH-58. After US-64 splits off to the west, SH-11 joins the concurrency.

After , SH-58 splits off to the northeast. SH-11 and SH-8 remain overlapped for seven more miles (11.3 km) before splitting off to the north. SH-8 ends  to the north of this at the Kansas state line. After crossing the state line, it becomes K-8, which soon ends at K-2 in Kiowa, Kansas.

History
SH-8 was one of the original thirty-one state highways created on 1924-08-24. When it was created, it was a border-to-border highway, stretching from Texas to Kansas. It began at the Red River near Burkburnett, Texas. It then passed through Randlett and had a short concurrency with SH-5 west of Walters. The highway then ran through Lawton—concurring with the original SH-29—en route to Anadarko via Apache. In Anadarko, SH-8 linked up with the present highway. The remainder of the route was mostly the same as it is today.

In November 1926, AASHTO officially approved the United States Numbered Highways system. The Oklahoma Transportation Commission applied the national highways to Oklahoma's state highway system on 1926-11-26. Three U.S. highways were assigned to portions of what was then SH-8: U.S. Highway 64 was added to a segment of highway south of Cherokee, U.S. Highway 66 was added between Bridgeport and Geary, and U.S. Highway 70 was added from the Texas state line to Randlett. US-66 and 64 merely ran concurrently with SH-8. However, US-70 completely replaced the state highway, which was truncated so that its southern terminus was at US-70 in Randlett.

By 1936, several U.S. highways had been added to the system that took over parts of State Highway 8's route. US-62, added in 1930, took over the Lawton–Anadarko portion of the road. US-277 took over much of the remaining route between Randlett and Lawton. In addition, a US-70N had been created that overlaid US-277 between Randlett and the split with SH-5 west of Walters. These changes to the U.S. route system precipitated the truncation of SH-8 in 1936. On 1936-03-13, the section of the route between Anadarko and the state line was dropped. However, a new road between Anadarko and Cyril had been built; this became part of SH-8 and set the highway's southern terminus at its present location.

By the end of 1937, however, the highway's southern terminus had changed once again. On 1937-10-19, SH-8 had been truncated to Anadarko. However, on 1938-10-18, the route was extended back to the former southern terminus at Randlett; this change did not appear on the state map until the April 1941 edition. On 1941-04-14, the route was realigned to run through Cyril once again.

On 1955-09-12, SH-8 underwent a small realignment. Previously, the highway went due north from Carmen, then turned due east, running through Lambert before connecting to US-64 south of Cherokee. As a result of the 1955 realignment, SH-8 cut northeast to connect to US-64 directly, bypassing Lambert.

All of SH-8 between Randlett and Cyril was once again dropped on 1966-05-09, restoring the route to its current southern terminus at US-277/SH-19 in Cyril. No major changes to the highway have occurred since 1966.

Spurs
 SH-8A runs from SH-8 to SH-51A, north of Watonga. Along the way, it provides access to Roman Nose State Park.
 A former SH-8A connected the highway to the town of Geronimo. When SH-8 was truncated to Cyril in 1966, it became SH-281A.
 SH-8B is a spur route from SH-8 to Aline.

Junction list

See also

 List of state highways in Oklahoma

References

External links

 SH-8 at OKHighways
 SH-8A at OKHighways
 SH-8B at OKHighways
 OK-8 on Two Wheel Oklahoma

008
Transportation in Caddo County, Oklahoma
Transportation in Canadian County, Oklahoma
Transportation in Blaine County, Oklahoma
Transportation in Major County, Oklahoma
Transportation in Alfalfa County, Oklahoma